Tête de Milon (3,693 m) is a mountain of the Swiss Pennine Alps, located east of Zinal in the canton of Valais. It belongs to the massif of the Weisshorn and lies west of the Turtmann Glacier.

The Cabane de Tracuit, a mountain hut owned by the Swiss Alpine Club, is located north of the mountain at a height of 3,256 metres.

References

External links
 Tête de Milon on Hikr

Mountains of the Alps
Alpine three-thousanders
Mountains of Switzerland
Mountains of Valais